Hovedstadens Lokalbaner is a Danish company that owns the trains and tracks of several local railways around Copenhagen: Frederiksværkbanen, Gribskovbanen, Hornbækbanen, Lille Nord, Nærumbanen and Østbanen. It leases trains and trackage rights to the operating companies DSB S-tog (for Lille Nord) and Lokalbanen (all other lines).

See also
 Lokalbanen

 
Railway companies of Denmark
Companies based in Hillerød Municipality
Railway companies established in 2002
2002 establishments in Denmark